Delphine Lannuzel is a sea ice biogeochemist and Senior Lecturer at the Institute for Marine and Antarctic Studies (IMAS), University of Tasmania.

Early life and education 
Lannuzel completed her undergraduate degree at the Institut Universitaire Européen de la Mer, Brest, France in 2001. In 2006, Lannuzel was awarded her PhD in Biogeochemistry of iron in the Antarctic sea ice environment from the Université Libre de Bruxelles, Belgium.

Career and impact 
Lannuzel was previously an Australian Research Council (ARC) Discovery Early Career Researcher at IMAS. Lannuzel's research is in the study of trace metals in the sea ice environment

The iron and other trace element data generated from her research represented the first for the Antarctic pack ice zone. Her pioneering work highlighted the accumulation of trace element iron in sea ice and therefore the paramount importance of Antarctic sea ice to iron biogeochemical cycling in polar ecosystems.

Awards and honors 
In 2007 Lannuzel was awarded a Scientific Committee on Antarctic Research (SCAR) Fellowship. In 2011 she was awarded both the University of Tasmania Vice Chancellor Award for Research Excellence and the Japan Society for the Promotion of Science Award.

References

External links 
 

Living people
Australian Antarctic scientists
Australian biochemists
Australian geochemists
Australian women chemists
Women biochemists
Women Antarctic scientists
Year of birth missing (living people)